Handnesøya Chapel is a chapel of the Church of Norway in Nesna Municipality in Nordland county, Norway. It is located in the village of Saura on the southeastern shore of the island of Handnesøya. It is an annex chapel in the Nesna parish which is part of the Nord-Helgeland prosti (deanery) in the Diocese of Sør-Hålogaland. The white, wooden chapel was built in a long church style in 1921. The chapel seats about 70 people.

History
The local villagers erected the Handnesøya Chapel on a voluntary basis, and it was to serve as a church building for the island of Handnesøya. From the beginning, the chapel was organized as a privately-owned prayer house. During the 1960s, a cooperative was formed by the villagers who became the formal owner of the church building. In June 1969, after an extensive restoration and extension, the prayer house was consecrated as an annex chapel by the Bishop of Sør-Hålogaland.

See also
List of churches in Sør-Hålogaland

References

Nesna
Churches in Nordland
Wooden churches in Norway
20th-century Church of Norway church buildings
Churches completed in 1921
1921 establishments in Norway
Long churches in Norway